The 1998 Pacific Curling Championships were held from December 13 to 18 in Qualicum Beach, British Columbia, Canada. 

New Zealand won the men's event over Japan (it was the first Pacific title for the New Zealand men). On the women's side, Japan defeated New Zealand in the final (it was the seventh Pacific title for the Japanese women).   

By virtue of winning, the New Zealand men's team and the Japanese women's team qualified for the 1999 World  and  Curling Championships in Saint John, New Brunswick, Canada.

The event was originally to be played at a new curling facility in Dunedin, New Zealand, but construction delays forced the event to be held in Canada. The New Zealand Curling Association ran the event.

Men

Teams

Round Robin

 Teams to playoffs

Playoffs

Semifinal

Final

Final standings

Women

Teams

Round Robin
Final round robin results.

 Teams to playoffs

Playoffs

Final standings

References

External links

Pacific Curling Championships, 1998
Pacific-Asia Curling Championships
International curling competitions hosted by Canada
1998 in Canadian curling
Curling in British Columbia
December 1998 sports events in Canada